Sebastián Villa may refer to:

 Sebastián Villa (diver) (born 1992), Colombian diver
 Sebastián Villa (footballer) (born 1996), Colombian footballer